Hypotacha fractura is a species of moth in the family Erebidae. It is found in India.

References

Moths described in 2005
Hypotacha
Moths of Asia